In the Moment may refer to:

 In the Moment (Kaskade album), 2004
 In the Moment (Gateway album), 1996
 In the Moment (Larnell Lewis album), 2018

See also
 In the Moment – Live in Concert, a 2000 album by Dianne Reeves